"Súbeme la Radio" is a song by Spanish singer Enrique Iglesias featuring Cuban singer Descemer Bueno and Puerto Rican reggaeton duo Zion & Lennox. The song was released by RCA Records and Sony Music Latin on 24 February 2017. It was written by Iglesias, Zion & Lennox, Bueno, Chris Jeday, Juan Rivera and Luis Ortiz, and produced by Jeday, Carlos Paucar and Gaby Music. "Súbeme la Radio" peaked at number two in Spain and on the US Hot Latin Songs chart.

Background
Several remixes were commissioned for the release of "Súbeme la Radio", including one with Cuban singer Jacob Forever instead of Zion & Lennox, one featuring Latin American pop boy band CNCO and a salsa version of the song was recorded with Puerto Rican singer Gilberto Santa Rosa. A Spanglish remix, featuring Jamaican singer Sean Paul, replacing Descemer Bueno and Zion & Lennox, was also released. It was sent to US contemporary hit radio on 25 July 2017.

Another Spanglish version of the song was released on 21 July 2017, featuring Paul and English singer Matt Terry who sings the second verse, instead of Iglesias. This version reached the top 10 on the UK Singles Chart.

Music video
On his official Facebook page, Iglesias teased that the single would be released on 24 February 2017, along with the music video, which was filmed in Cuba. The video features Iglesias with the guest artists inside and on top of a bus at different scenes. It shows Enrique falling in love with a Cuban woman and he follows her through the streets. It also features a big crowd participation surrounding the performers as they sing and dance along with them. The music video was directed by Alejandro Pérez and was produced by Yasha Malekzad and Kasra Pezeshki. As of December 2019, the video has received 1.2 billion views on YouTube.

Track listing

Charts

Weekly charts

Year-end charts

Certifications

See also
List of Billboard number-one Latin songs of 2017

References

2017 singles
Enrique Iglesias songs
2017 songs
Sony Music Latin singles
Songs written by Enrique Iglesias
Spanish-language songs
Songs written by Descemer Bueno
Zion & Lennox songs
Songs about radio
Songs written by Chris Jedi